Mieczysław Morański (21 January 1960 – 27 December 2020) was a Polish actor.

Biography
He was mostly known for his dubbing of popular children film and cartoon characters, including Barney, Asterix, and Slinky Dog, as well as Eric Cartman. He had several roles in Polish soap operas, amongst others in Na dobre i na złe, Na wspólnej and Plebania. He was also an accomplished theatre actor throughout his life, right until his death from COVID-19 during the COVID-19 pandemic in Poland in 2020, twenty five days short from his 61st birthday.

References

External links
 Filmweb.pl profile
 eteatr.pl profile
 Filmpolski.pl profile

1960 births
2020 deaths
Polish male stage actors
Polish male voice actors
Deaths from the COVID-19 pandemic in Poland
Male actors from Warsaw